Dimna may refer to:

Dimna Lake, an artificial reservoir in Jharkhand, India
Panchatantra, the collection of Indian animal fables
Dimnøya, an island in Møre og Romsdal, Norway